The 2019–2021 edition of the FIDE Grand Prix was a series of four chess tournaments exclusively for women which determined two players to play in the Women's Candidates Tournament 2022. The winner of the Candidates Tournament will play a 12-game match against the world champion in the Women's World Chess Championship 2022.

This is the fifth cycle of the tournament series. The number one woman player, Hou Yifan, who won the first three editions of the Grand Prix, was unable to play due to studies at Oxford University.

Players 
16 players were published by FIDE in July 2019.

R Due to travel restrictions on Chinese citizens due to the Coronavirus outbreak , Zhao Xue was unable to participate in the Lausanne leg of the Grand Prix. She was replaced by Zhansaya Abdumalik.
For the Gibraltar WGP, Koneru, Ju, Zhao and Sebag were replaced by Zhansaya Abdumalik, Dinara Saduakassova, Irina Bulmaga and Gunay Mammadzada. These replacement players were not eligible for the Candidates spots.

Schedule and results

The fourth stage of the Grand Prix, initially planned from 2 to 15 May 2020 in Sardinia, was postponed by FIDE due to the ongoing Coronavirus pandemic. FIDE announced that the fourth stop of the Women Grand Prix was to be held in Gibraltar on January 17–29, 2021, but it was then postponed again to 22 May to 2 June 2021.

Events crosstables

Grand Prix standings 

160 Grand Prix points were awarded for 1st, 130 for 2nd, 110 for 3rd and then in steps of 10 from 90 for 4th to 10 for 12th place. If players ended up tied on points, points for those places were shared equally.

As Goryachkina was already qualified for the Candidates Tournament, the third place qualified instead of her. The replacements (in italics) were not eligible to qualify for the Candidates.

References

External links 
Official website

Women's chess competitions
2019 in chess
2020 in chess
FIDE Grand Prix